The Independent Evangelical-Lutheran Church (abbreviated SELK)  is a confessional Lutheran church body of Germany.  It is a member of the European Lutheran Conference and of the International Lutheran Council (ILC) (of which the Lutheran Church–Missouri Synod of North America is also a member). The SELK has about 33,000 members in 174 congregations. The seat of SELK is in Hanover.

History 

In 1817, King Frederick William III of Prussia ordered the Lutheran and Reformed churches in his territory to unite, forming the Evangelical Church of the Prussian Union, a predecessor to today's Union of Evangelical Churches.  As the uniting of Lutheran and Reformed Christians in Germany proceeded, some Lutheran groups dissented and formed independent churches, especially in Prussia, Saxony, Hanover and Hesse.  These Lutherans held that Reformed doctrine and Lutheran doctrine are contradictory on many points (especially on the nature of the Real Presence of Christ in the Lord's Supper), and that such doctrinal differences precluded altar fellowship. So in the 1820s and 1830s Lutherans in Prussia and their congregations formed a new Lutheran church, recognised by the king in 1845 as the Evangelisch-Lutherische Kirche in Preußen (Evangelical Lutheran Church in Prussia). It was seated in Breslau and presided over by the Oberkirchenkollegium (Supreme Church Collegial Body).

The confessional Lutherans were persecuted during the first half of 19th century by the state. Many of them were not allowed to hold church services or have their children baptized or confirmed according to the liturgy of the Lutheran Church. In some areas of Germany, it took decades until the Confessional Lutherans were granted religious freedom.

In 1972 most of the Confessional Lutheran Church bodies in West Germany united to form the SELK. In 1991 the East German Evangelisch-Lutherische (altlutherische) Kirche (the Evangelical-Lutheran (Old-Lutheran) Church) joined the SELK.

Doctrine

Basics 

The SELK bases its teaching on the Bible, consisting of the Old and New Testaments, which it confesses to be God's inerrant and infallible Word.  The specific doctrines taught in the SELK are contained in the Book of Concord, to which SELK pastors profess a "quia" subscription, meaning that they subscribe to them, "quia" (because) they correspond to the Bible. These Confessions are:

 The Apostles' Creed
 The Nicene Creed
 The Athanasian Creed
 The Augsburg Confession (1530)
 The Apology of the Augsburg Confession
 The Smalcald Articles
 The Small Catechism of Dr. Martin Luther
 The Large Catechism of Dr. Martin Luther
 The Formula of Concord

The SELK has declined to join the Lutheran World Federation, viewing that body as theologically too liberal. Nevertheless, the Evangelical Lutheran Free Church (Germany), formerly in communion with the SELK, suspended relations in 1987 over perceived doctrinal laxity within SELK.

The SELK does not ordain women as pastors, and is strictly against the blessing of gay couples. This is in contrast to the German mainline Protestant churches, which do ordain women to ministry and allow the blessing of gay couples.  The mainline Protestant churches (about 25 million members) are organized as the Evangelical Church in Germany (Evangelische Kirche in Deutschland, EKD).

Church Structure 
The bishop of the SELK is elected by the synod. The current bishop is Hans-Jörg Voigt. The main office of the SELK is in Hannover, and is managed by the executive dean Michael Schätzel. The SELK is divided in four main districts, with a provost heading each one. These four districts are divided again in sub-districts, each in turn led by a superintendent.

 North district: Provost Dr. Daniel Schmidt
 Sub-districts: Lower Saxony East and Lower Saxony South
 East district: Provost Gert Kelter
 Sub-districts: Berlin-Brandenburg, Saxony-Thuringia and Lausitz
 West district: Provost Burkhard Kurz
 Sub-districts: Rhineland-Westphalia and Lower Saxony West
 South district: Provost Manfred Holst
 Sub-districts: Hesse North, Hesse South and South Germany

Bishops since 1972 

 1972 - 1985: Most Reverend Bishop Dr. theol. Gerhard Rost, LL.D. 
 1985 - 1997: Most Reverend Bishop Dr. theol. Jobst Schöne, D.D. 
 1997 - 2006: Most Reverend Bishop Dr. theol. Diethardt Roth 
 since 2006: Most Reverend Bishop Hans-Jörg Voigt, D.D.

Church institutions

Mission 
The mission outreach of SELK is led by its mission society in Bleckmar in Lower Saxony near Celle, called Lutherische Kirchenmission (Bleckmarer Mission) e. V. It has missionaries and projects in South-Africa, Botswana, Germany, and Brazil.

Education 
The theological seminary is in Oberursel, near Frankurt/Main. All SELK pastors take part of their studies there. The professors are pastors of SELK. The seminary is accredited by the German state.

Other church institutions 
For different aspects of church life the SELK has a number of other institutions, such as an institution for youth, church music, worship service for children, a liturgy commission, and a commission for church education.

Relationship with other church bodies

Fellowship 

The SELK has full communion and fellowship with several Lutheran churches that have the same teaching and Lutheran doctrine, for example:

 Lutheran Church–Missouri Synod
 Lutheran Church–Canada
 Free Evangelical-Lutheran Synod in South Africa
 Evangelical Lutheran Church of England
Lutheran Church in Southern Africa

Partnership 
The SELK has a contract about partnership relations with several Lutheran churches in Eastern Europe:

 Evangelical Lutheran Church of Latvia
 Evangelical Lutheran Church of Lithuania

See also 

Prussian Union of churches
Old Lutherans

References

External links 
 

SELK
SELK
SELK
SELK
SELK